Wolstenholme Fjord is a fjord in Avannaata municipality, Northwest Greenland. It is located to the north of the Thule Air Base and adjacent to the abandoned Inuit settlement of Narsaarsuk.

The area was contaminated in 1968 with plutonium and other radioactive elements following a B-52 bomber crash.

Geography
Wolstenholme Fjord is located in the stretch of coast between Cape York and Cape Alexander. Together with the Inglefield Gulf it is one of the two main indentations in the area.

Saunders Island, Wolstenholme Island and the Bylot Sound lie at the mouth of the Fjord in North Star Bay. Further to the west on the northern shore lies the Granville Fjord.

The fjord's waters are fed by four large glaciers: the Salisbury Glacier, the Chamberlin Glacier, the Knud Rasmussen Glacier, and the Harald Moltke Glacier.

See also 
List of fjords of Greenland
Saunders Island, Greenland

Further reading 

 Svend Funder, Late Quaternary Stratigraphy and Glaciology in the Thule Area, Northwest Greenland
 United States. Defense Mapping Agency, United States. Naval Oceanographic Office, Sailing Directions for West Coast of Greenland, Volumes 16-968, PP 338 - 339
 Steven J. Mock, Fluctuations of the terminus of the Moltke Glacier, Cold Regions Research and Engineering Laboratory (U.S.), P 2

References

Fjords of Greenland